Cowdrey may refer to:


People

Sportspeople
Anne Cowdrey, 14th Lady Herries of Terregles (1938–2014), British racehorse owner
Charlie Cowdrey (1933–2011), American football coach
Chris Cowdrey (born 1957), English cricketer, the son of Colin Cowdrey
Colin Cowdrey (1932–2000), English cricketer
Fabian Cowdrey (born 1993), English cricketer, the son of Chris Cowdrey
Graham Cowdrey (born 1964), English cricketer, the son of Colin Cowdrey
Matt Cowdrey (born 1988), Australian swimmer

Other people
Albert E. Cowdrey (born 1933), American author
H. E. J. Cowdrey (1926–2009), English historian of the Middle Ages

Other
Cowdrey Cricket Club, an amateur cricket club in Tonbridge, Kent, named after Colin Cowdrey
Cowdrey, Colorado, United States
Cowdrey House, an historic house in Yellville, Arkansas
George Cowdrey House, an historic houses in Stoneham, Massachusetts
Lake Cowdrey, a lake in Minnesota